Rodica Drăguș (born 28 October 1964) is a Romanian cross-country skier. She competed in three events at the 1988 Winter Olympics.

References

External links
 

1964 births
Living people
Romanian female cross-country skiers
Olympic cross-country skiers of Romania
Cross-country skiers at the 1988 Winter Olympics
Place of birth missing (living people)